Chandler Township may refer to one of the following places in the United States:

Chandler Township, Charlevoix County, Michigan
Chandler Township, Huron County, Michigan
Chandler Township, Adams County, North Dakota

See also
Chandler (disambiguation)

Township name disambiguation pages